Vivienne Chandler (6 November 1947 – 6 June 2013) was an English-born French actress and a professional photographer.

Biography
Chandler made her first appearance on TV in ITV Playhouse in 1970, but immediately began acting minor parts in a number of major early 1970s films including Lust for a Vampire, Duck, You Sucker! and Stanley Kubrick's A Clockwork Orange. She appeared in several small roles in the 1980s, including portraying Chantale (the mother) in the music video for the 1983 song "The Smile Has Left Your Eyes" by the rock band Asia. She was cast as an X-wing pilot in Return of the Jedi, but did not appear in the final film. She later became a professional photographer working in the United States and many countries across Europe including France, Italy and the UK. She went to University Paris Diderot between her film and television roles but all the time was interested in the process of image-making.

She had a son and a daughter to John Carder Bush.

Her final struggle with cancer is featured in a short video ‘Ceaseless Sound’.

Photography
As a photographer she reinvented her name for a while as Holly Bush and later Holly Bund as her career changed direction. Photographing mainly children, she exhibited in London, Oxford and Kent and sold to private collectors in France, England and Japan. She was a Fellow of the Royal Society of Photographers. 

Her photography techniques aided John Carder Bush in creating the album covers for Kate Bush's The Dreaming and The Whole Story. She also styled the cover for Hounds of Love and assisted in Kate Bush's photo sessions, including for John Carder Bush's book Cathy.

Filmography
ITV Playhouse (1 episode, 1970) as Liza Curtis
Lust for a Vampire (1971) as Schoolgirl
Twins of Evil (1971) as Schoolgirl (uncredited)
Duck, You Sucker! (1971) as Coleen, John's Girlfriend (flashback)
A Clockwork Orange (1971) as Handmaiden in Bible Fantasy
Victor Victoria (1982) as Chambermaid
The Draughtsman's Contract (1982) as Laundress
The Ploughman's Lunch (1983) as Mum in Commercial
Return of the Jedi (1983) as Dorovio Bold, Fighter Pilot (uncredited)
Young Sherlock Holmes (1985) as Mrs. Holmes
Babies (1997, TV Series) as Advertising Executive 2

References

External links and sources
 
 Official website

1947 births
2013 deaths
French film actresses
French photographers
French television actresses
French women photographers
Place of birth missing
20th-century French actresses